Équeurdreville may mean or refer to:

 Équeurdreville-Hainneville, a commune in the Manche department of the Normandy region of northern France
 Équeurdreville, the community that merged with Hainneville on January 1, 1965 to form Équeurdreville-Hainneville
 Brécourt, a World War II V-weapon bunker built near Équeurdreville